Antemasque may refer to:

Antemasque (band), an American rock band formed in 2014
Antemasque (album), the 2014 debut album by Antemasque
Antimasque, a 16th- and early 17th-century court entertainment